The Old Oquirrh Bucket (named after the Oquirrh Mountains to the west of Salt Lake City, as well as the famous Old Oaken Bucket) is the symbol of in-state basketball supremacy in Utah. Every year from 1974 to 2010, the trophy was awarded to the in-state college team (University of Utah (U of U), Brigham Young University (BYU), Utah State University (USU), Weber State University (WSU), Utah Valley University (UVU), and Southern Utah University (SUU)) that had the best win–loss record against in-state competition.

In 1974, a proposal was presented to create a trophy – a symbol to be awarded annually to Utah's best college basketball team.  The concept was accepted and for the first two years the in-state title was awarded to the Aggies (USU), although no actual trophy had been determined.

In 1977, after Weber State won the title for the first time, an Ogden businessman located a pioneer bucket at a local auction, complete with a history of how it had been found.  It became the traveling trophy emblematic of Utah college basketball supremacy.

The plaque on the bucket includes a map with the names and locations of the 4 original schools (BYU, U of U, USU, and WSU or WSC for Weber State College).  SUU and UVU did not field Division-I basketball programs at the time the trophy was created, but have since become members of the NCAA Division-I.  The plaque includes the caption "The Oquirrh Bucket Utah State Collegiate Champ Basketball".

Utah (U of U) has won the bucket 14 times, followed by Utah State (USU) and Brigham Young (BYU) with 9 victories each, and Weber State (WSU) with 4.  Neither of the other two schools have ever won the award.  On November 15, 2010, it was announced that the trophy would be retired, due to the recent changes in conference alignments (Utah leaving the Mountain West for the Pac-12, BYU leaving the Mountain West for the West Coast Conference) and changes in scheduling of games among the in-state schools.  The Old Oquirrh Bucket was last won by Utah State in both 2008–09 and 2009–10, and will be donated by Utah State University to the Utah Sports Hall of Fame.

Oquirrh Bucket history

References 

College basketball rivalry trophies in the United States
Utah Utes men's basketball
Utah State Aggies men's basketball
BYU Cougars men's basketball
Weber State Wildcats men's basketball
Utah Valley Wolverines men's basketball
Southern Utah Thunderbirds men's basketball